Brioche (also ,) is a bread of French origin whose high egg and butter content gives it a rich and tender crumb. Chef Joël Robuchon described it as "light and slightly puffy, more or less fine, according to the proportion of butter and eggs." It has a dark, golden, and flaky crust, frequently accentuated by an egg wash applied after proofing.

Brioche is considered a Viennoiserie because it is made in the same basic way as bread but has the richer aspect of a pastry because of the extra addition of eggs, butter, liquid (milk, water, cream, and, sometimes, brandy) and occasionally sugar. Brioche, along with pain au lait and pain aux raisins—which are commonly eaten at breakfast or as a snack—form a leavened subgroup of Viennoiserie. Brioche is often baked with additions of fruit or chocolate chips and served on its own or as the basis of a dessert, with many regional variations in added ingredients, fillings, or toppings.

Forms
Brioche has numerous uses in cuisine and can take on various forms, served plain or filled, as coulibiac, or with many other different savory fillings, such as fillet of beef en croute, foie gras, sausage, cervelat lyonnais. Brioche can also be served with sweet fillings, especially fresh fruits, vanilla cream, or jam.

Brioche de Nanterre is a loaf of brioche made in a standard loaf pan. Instead of shaping two pieces of dough and baking them together, two rows of small pieces are placed in the pan. Loaves are then proofed (allowed to rise) in the pan, fusing the pieces. The dough balls rise further during the baking process and form an attractive pattern.

Brioche can also be made in a pan without being rolled into balls to make an ordinary loaf.

Brioche dough contains flour, eggs, butter, liquid (milk, water, cream, and sometimes brandy), leavening (yeast or sourdough), salt, and sometimes sugar. A common flour-to-butter ratio is 2:1, but historically, brioche of varying degrees of richness (from the "rich man's brioche" with a flour-to-butter ratio of 3:2 to the cheaper  with a ratio of 4:1) have existed at the same time.

The normal preparation method is to make the dough, let it rise to double its volume at room temperature, and then punch it down and let it rise again in the refrigerator for varying periods (according to the recipe), retarding the dough to develop the flavor. Refrigeration also stiffens the dough, which still rises, albeit slowly, making it easier to form. The dough is then shaped, placed in containers for the final proofing, and generally brushed on top with an egg wash before being baked at  until the crust browns and the interior reaches at least . The first rise time for small rolls is 1 to 1½ hours; for larger brioche, the time is lengthened until the loaves double.

History

The first recorded use of the word in French dates from 1404. It is attested in 1611 in Cotgrave's A Dictionarie of the French and English Tongues, where it is described as "a rowle, or bunne, of spiced bread" and its origin given as Norman.

In France, it developed as "a sort of bread improved since antiquity by generations of bakers, then of pastry-makers ... with some butter, some eggs, sugar coming later ... it developed from the blessed bread [pain bénit] of the church which gradually became of better quality, more and more costly, less and less bread; until becoming savory brioche". In the 17th century "pâté à tarte briochée," "a pain à brioche pauvre [poor] ... [using only] 3 eggs and 250 grams of butter for 1 kilogram of flour" was introduced. The terms "pain bénit" and "brioche" were sometimes used together or virtually interchangeably; so, for example, in another 17th-century recipe entitled: "CHAPITRE II. Pain bénit, & brioches." It begins with a lighter, cheaper version of blessed bread, calling for "a pound of fresh butter and a soft cheese [but no eggs!] for a pail of flour"; and goes on to describe "the more delicate that we call Cousin," which uses 3 pounds of butter, two kinds of cheese, and a royal pint of eggs for the same amount of flour, as well as "some good milk" if "the dough is too firm." However, sourdough and brewer's yeast preparations would both remain common well into the next century, with "blessed bread ... more and more often replaced by brioche" in the 18th century, where "Those from Gisors and Gournay, great butter markets, were the most highly regarded."

For the wealthy "from the time of Louis XIV onwards ... Butter, in widespread use at least in the northern half of France, was the secret of making brioches". "In Gisors, on market days, they produce up to 250 or 300 kg of brioches. The dough is made the evening before (1 kg of farine, a quarter of which for the starter, 10 g of yeast, 7 or 8 eggs; one mixes this with the starter and 800 g of butter, breaking up the dough, which 'uses up the butter'). The dough is kept in a terrine, and one puts it in a mold just at the moment of baking. Thus prepared, the brioche remains light, keeps well, maintains the flavour of butter, without the stench of the starter."

Jean-Jacques Rousseau, in his autobiography Confessions, relates that "a great princess" is said to have advised, with regard to peasants who had no bread, "," commonly translated as  "Let them eat cake." This saying is commonly misattributed to Queen Marie-Antoinette, wife of Louis XVI.

Etymology
Although there has been much debate about the etymology of the word and, thus, the recipe's origins, it is now widely accepted that it is derived from the Old French verb "brier," "a Norman dialectical form of broyer, to work the dough with a broye or brie (a sort of wooden roller for kneading); the suffix -oche is a generic deverbal suffix. Pain brié is a Norman bread whose dense dough was formerly worked with this instrument." The word is of Germanic origin, probably derived from the Proto-Indo-European root bhreg (to break).

Types
 La brioche aux fruits confits or gâteau des rois
 Gâche
 Brioche de Nanterre
 Brioche vendéenne
 Brioche tressée de Metz
 Cougnou
 Pogne, Dauphiné
 Gâteau de Saint-Genix, Saint-Genix-sur-Guiers
 Chinois or Schneckenkuchen ("snail pie"), Alsace-Lorraine
 Tarte Tropézienne, with custard
 Brioscia, Sicily
 King cake

Related breads

Many other breads are enriched with eggs and often milk and butter; many of them are braided.

Gallery

See also

 Cottage loaf
 Craquelin
 Ensaymada
 Gugelhupf
 List of French dishes
 Mouna
 Panbrioche
 Panettone

Notes

External links 
 
 

Brioches
French breads
Norman cuisine
Yeast breads
Braided egg breads